A sewn boat is a type of wooden boat which is clinker built with its planks sewn, stitched, tied, or bound together with tendons or flexible wood, such as roots and willow branches.  Sewn boat construction techniques were used in many parts of the world prior to the development of metal fasteners, and continued to be used long after that time for small boats to reduce construction costs where metal fasteners were too expensive.

Name and similar techniques
Although well established, the sewn boat name is somewhat misleading since it suggests textile or leather skin construction, as often found in kayaks.  Some have proposed to use  laced boats (Ge. geschnürte Boote) instead.  A modern plywood construction method that resembles sewn boats is the stitch and glue method; in this technique plywood panels are stitched together, often with wire, and the seams are reinforced with fiberglass composite; the stitching may then be removed or may remain in place. Also related is the treenailed boat.

Lashed lug construction is used in the distinctive maritime technology of  Austronesian peoples.

Construction
Sewn boats start with the construction of the hull, or outside "shell" of the boat, rather than the frame, resulting in a monocoque type of structure. Carefully shaped planks are connected at the edges, usually in the clinker style, with overlapping sections which are sewn together. As the planks are placed together, the hull begins to bend into the desired shape. The resulting structure is highly flexible. Internal framing may be added to the planks after they are sewn in, providing additional rigidity.

While wooden pegs (often called treenails) can be used to fasten thicker clinker planks, this technique only works if the planks are thick enough to hold the pegs.  Because of this, large ships were often built using pegs, while smaller boats would use sewn planks.

History
The earliest known example of a sewn boat is the 40+ metres long "Solar" funerary boat on show near the Gizeh pyramid, in Egypt; it dates back from 2600 BC. The sewn construction was a natural step when coming from raft or reed boatbuilding, which dates from some thousands of years before that. In other parts of the world, the oldest sewn craft comes from North Ferriby, where one sample (called F3) mass-spectrometry dates to 2030 BC.  Later finds include some early Greek ships. The oldest Nordic find is the Hjortspring boat in Denmark (c 300 BC).  In Finland, Russia, Karelia and Estonia small sewn boats have been constructed more recently, until the 1920s in poor areas of Russia.

Sewn construction is used in the various forms of the Austronesian "proas" of the Indo-Pacific (which also used the lashed-lug techniques) and the Middle Eastern and South Asian dhow native to the Red Sea, Persian Gulf, and Indian Ocean. Despite their proximity and similarity, they differ markedly from each other, indicating that they developed independently. Austronesian boat-sewing techniques are discontinuous and are only visible from the inside surfaces of the hull, while South Asian and Middle Eastern boat-sewing techniques are visible in both the exterior and interior of the hull and are continuous.

Comparison with other traditions 
Though the sewn boat technique (but not the lashed lugs) is also used for boats in the western Indian Ocean traditions, it differs in that the stitching in Austronesian boats are discontinuous and only visible from the inside of the hull. This indicates that the sewn boat techniques of the Indian Ocean and Austronesia are not culturally-linked and developed independent of each other. The planks of ancient Austronesian ships were originally joined together using only the sewn boat technique. However, the development of metallurgy in Maritime Southeast Asia in the last two thousand years resulted in the replacement of the sewing technique with internal dowels, as well as increasing use of metal nails.

Examples of sewn boats
Dhow
Mtepe
Nordland
Itaomacip

See also
Lashed-lug boat
Hjortspring boat

References

External links
A full-scale replica of a Hjortspring Boat, an early Viking sewn boat
Reconstruction of sewing boatbuilding technique & building of a sewn boat replica at Fotevikens Museum
Abstract of Construction and Qualitative Analysis of a Sewn Boat of the Western Indian Ocean
Underwater Archaeology Glossary definition of sewn boat
Ferriby Boats website, with information on archeological finds
Odyssey 5.234-53 and Homeric Ship Construction: A Reappraisal, an analysis of Iron Age Greek ship laced boat construction methods
Traditional watercraft of Viet Nam Construction of a sewn plank boat by two of the last living Vietnamese builders, documented in photographs.
 HAND - SEWN BOAT. Local fishing-boat constructed off accurately crafted planks, sewn together with coir rope. flickr.com

Boat types